Calistoga (Wappo: Nilektsonoma) is a city in Napa County, California, United States. Located in the North Bay region of the Bay Area, the city had a population of 5,228 as of the 2020 census.

Calistoga was founded in 1868 when the California Pacific Railroad was built, establishing the town as a tourist destination for its Calistoga Hot Springs. Today, Calistoga continues as a popular tourist destination in Wine Country, owing to its vineyards and historic landmarks.

History

The Upper Napa Valley was once the home of a significant population of Indigenous People, called the Wappo during the Spanish colonial era of the late 18th century. With abundant oak trees providing acorns as a food staple and the natural hot springs as a healing ground Calistoga (Wappo: Nilektsonoma, meaning "Chicken Hawk Place") was the site of several villages. Following Mexican Independence, mission properties were secularized and disposed of by the Mexican government with much of the Napa Valley being partitioned into large ranchos in the 1830s and 1840s. The first Anglo settlers began arriving in the 1840s, with several taking up lands in the Calistoga area.

Samuel Brannan was the leader of a Mormon settlement expedition on the ship Brooklyn landing in Yerba Buena (San Francisco) in 1846. He published San Francisco's first English language newspaper, the California Star. Following the discovery of gold in Coloma, Brannan became California's first millionaire.

The name of Calistoga was given to the place in the fall of 1867, by Mr. Brannan, who has been reported and quoted as saying that the name came from a slip of the tongue that transformed "Saritoga of California" into "Calistoga of Sarifornia". The place had already been previously called Hot Springs by the few Americans, and Agua Caliente by the Spaniards and Indians.

Brannan's Hot Springs Resort surrounding Mt Lincoln with the Spa/Hotel located at what is now Indian Springs Resort and Brannan Cottage Inn, opened to California's rich and famous in 1862. The Napa Valley Railroad Company's track was completed to Calistoga in 1868, providing an easier connection for ferry passengers traveling from San Francisco, as well as transforming Calistoga into a transportation hub for the upper Napa Valley and a gateway to Lake and Sonoma Counties. 

Calistoga's economy was based on mining (silver and mercury) agriculture (grapes, prunes and walnuts) and tourism (the hot springs). One of the early visitors was Robert Louis Stevenson, who wrote the Silverado Squatters while honeymooning with his wife Fanny Vandegrift at a cabin near Silverado Mine on Mount Saint Helena.

In 1920, Giuseppe Musante, a soda fountain and candy store owner in Calistoga, was drilling for a cold water well at the Railway Exchange when he tapped into a hot water source. In 1924 he set up a bottling line and began selling Calistoga Sparkling Mineral Water. The company became a major player in the bottled water business after Elwood Sprenger bought the small bottling plant in 1970 known today as Calistoga Water Company.

Scenes from the movie Hot Rod 1979 were filmed in and around Calistoga. Scenes from the Disney movie Bedtime Stories starring Adam Sandler were filmed in Calistoga in June 2008.

Calistoga was named a Distinctive Destination by the National Trust for Historic Preservation in 2001.

In 2017, the Tubbs Fire, which killed at least 19 people, started off of Highway 128 and Bennett Lane in Calistoga. The fire led to the evacuation of almost the entire population of Calistoga. The 2017 Tubbs Fire took exactly the same path as the 1964 Hanley Fire. In 2020, the Glass Fire forced an evacuation of the city for the second time in four years.

Geography

Climate

According to National Weather Service records, Calistoga has cool, wet winters with temperatures dropping to freezing on an average of 35.6 days. Summers are usually very dry, with daytime temperatures regularly reaching 90 °F (32 °C) or higher on an average of 70.8 days, but nights are cool, dropping into the mid-fifties. The record high temperature of  occurred on September 6, 2022. Calistoga has a hot-summer Mediterranean climate (Csa) according to the Köppen climate classification system.

Snow often falls in the nearby mountains during the winter months, but is rare in Calistoga. On January 3, 1974, 3.0 inches of snow fell in the city.

Demographics

2010

At the 2010 census Calistoga had a population of 5,155. The racial makeup of Calistoga was 3,735 (72.5%) White, 27 (0.5%) African American, 21 (0.4%) Native American, 47 (0.9%) Asian, 10 (0.2%) Pacific Islander, 968 (18.8%) from other races, and 347 (6.7%) from two or more races. Hispanic or Latino of any race were 2,545 persons (49.4%).

The census reported that 5,100 people (98.9% of the population) lived in households, 20 (0.4%) lived in non-institutionalized group quarters, and 35 (0.7%) were institutionalized.

There were 2,019 households, 630 (31.2%) had children under the age of 18 living in them, 927 (45.9%) were opposite-sex married couples living together, 189 (9.4%) had a female householder with no husband present, 99 (4.9%) had a male householder with no wife present. There were 141 (7.0%) unmarried opposite-sex partnerships, and 20 (1.0%) same-sex married couples or partnerships. 641 households (31.7%) were one person and 332 (16.4%) had someone living alone who was 65 or older. The average household size was 2.53. There were 1,215 families (60.2% of households); the average family size was 3.23.

The age distribution was 1,167 people (22.6%) under the age of 18, 400 people (7.8%) aged 18 to 24, 1,341 people (26.0%) aged 25 to 44, 1,283 people (24.9%) aged 45 to 64, and 964 people (18.7%) who were 65 or older. The median age was 40.0 years. For every 100 females, there were 96.5 males. For every 100 females age 18 and over, there were 93.7 males.

There were 2,319 housing units at an average density of 887.3 per square mile, of the occupied units 1,166 (57.8%) were owner-occupied and 853 (42.2%) were rented. The homeowner vacancy rate was 3.4%; the rental vacancy rate was 5.0%. 2,545 people (49.4% of the population) lived in owner-occupied housing units and 2,555 people (49.6%) lived in rental housing units.

2000

At the 2000 census there were 5,190 people in 2,042 households, including 1,243 families, in the city.
Of the 2,042 households 29.0% had children under the age of 18 living with them, 47.2% were married couples living together, 8.2% had a female householder with no husband present, and 39.1% were non-families. 31.4% of households were one person and 17.1% were one person aged 65 or older. The average household size was 2.51 and the average family size was 3.20.

The age distribution was 23.3% under the age of 18, 8.5% from 18 to 24, 27.0% from 25 to 44, 21.7% from 45 to 64, and 19.6% 65 or older. The median age was 38 years. For every 100 females, there were 99.6 males. For every 100 females age 18 and over, there were 94.6 males.

The median income for a household in the city was $38,454, and the median family income  was $44,375. Males had a median income of $32,344 versus $29,844 for females. The per capita income for the city was $21,134. About 5.2% of families and 8.0% of the population were below the poverty line, including 9.5% of those under age 18 and 5.7% of those age 65 or over.

Economy

Major employers in Calistoga include Solage resort, Calistoga Joint Unified School District, Indian Springs Calistoga resort, and the  Calistoga Spa Hot Springs. Neighboring vineyards include Sterling Vineyards.

Tourism
Calistoga is at the north end of the Napa Valley Calistoga AVA, part of California's Wine Country. There are numerous wineries within a short drive. The city allows visitors to see wine country as it was before freeways and fast food—only two-lane roads lead there, inducing those segments of Highway 29 and Highway 128 that pass through Calistoga, and fast food franchises are banned by law.

Calistoga itself is noted for its hot springs spas such as Calistoga Spa Hot Springs. A local specialty is immersion in hot volcanic ash, known as a mud bath. Nearby attractions include an artificial geothermal geyser known as the "Old Faithful of California" or "Little Old Faithful". The geyser erupts from the casing of a well drilled in the late 19th century. According to Dr. John Rinehart in his book A Guide to Geyser Gazing (1976 p. 49), a man had drilled into the geyser in search for water. He had actually "simply opened up a dead geyser".

Government

The above districts are based on the 2011 Redistricting in California.

Notable people
 Bob Knepper, former Major League Baseball player, attended Calistoga High School.
 Tom Seaver, former Major League Baseball player, lived south of Calistoga.
 Dick Vermeil, former head coach of the Philadelphia Eagles, St. Louis Rams, & Kansas City Chiefs, was born in Calistoga.

See also
California Historical Landmarks in Napa County

References

External links

 
 The Calistoga Chamber of Commerce & Visitors Bureau
 Calistoga Tribune (one of two local newspapers)
 The Weekly Calistogan (one of two local newspapers)
 Warming Up in the Vineyard, Tom Terrific Article from The New York Times 2005-12-28

Cities in Napa County, California
Napa Valley
Incorporated cities and towns in California
Spa towns in California
Populated places established in 1886
1886 establishments in California
Cities in the San Francisco Bay Area